Irving Hale (August 28, 1861 – July 26, 1930) was a brigadier general of the United States of America who served in the Philippines during the Spanish–American War and the early stages of the Philippine–American War.

Biography
Born in New York, Hale's family moved to Colorado in 1865. He graduated at head of the first class from Denver East High School in 1877. He enrolled at West Point in 1880, and graduated at the head of his class four years later. His final score was 2070.4 points out of a possible 2075, which is the highest-ever score from the military academy.

Hale pursued studies in electrical engineering following his commission as a second lieutenant, but eventually resigned from the regular army to take a position with General Electric. Still living in Denver, Hale joined the state militia in 1897 as their lieutenant-colonel.

The First Colorado, like many other state militias, was sworn into service at the beginning of the Spanish–American War in April, 1898, with Hale in command. The Colorados were sent to the Philippines, along with other militias from western states. The First Colorado secured the American left flank during the Battle of Manila, capturing Fort San Agustin, and raising the first American flag over the city's fortifications; his excellent leadership secured Hale a promotion to the rank of brigadier general of volunteers in command of the 2d Brigade, 2d Division, Eighth Army Corps.

During the Philippine–American War, Hale led troops into battle on several occasions, and was wounded while scouting an enemy position during the battle of Meycauayan on March 26, 1899. He later received a Silver Star for his leadership near Calumpit on April 25, 1899.

Though offered a position in the new volunteer army, Hale decided to return home with the state militias in the fall and was honorably mustered out on October 1, 1899, returning to his civilian career as an electrical engineer. Following the war, he was active as one of the founders of the Veterans of Foreign Wars.

On September 29, 1911, Hale suffered a paralytic stroke from which he never fully recovered. He died on July 26, 1930, and is buried in Denver's Fairmount Cemetery.
The neighborhood of Hale, Denver is named for him. In addition, a prominent plaque in his honor was placed on the south side of the Colorado State Capitol Building, in Denver. (https://www.hmdb.org/m.asp?m=46108)

See also
 Camp Hale

External links
 

1861 births
1930 deaths
United States Army generals
People from Staten Island
American military personnel of the Spanish–American War
American military personnel of the Philippine–American War
National Commanders of the Veterans of Foreign Wars